Joane Somarriba Arrola (born 11 August 1972 in Gernika, Biscay) is a former Spanish cyclist.

She won the Grande Boucle in 2000, 2001 and 2003. She achieved a time trial victory at the 2003 World Championships in Hamilton, Canada. Additionally, she was a time trial silver medallist at the 2005 World Championships in Madrid and took a road race bronze medal at the 2002 World Championships in Zolder/Hasselt, Belgium.

She retired from cycling in 2005.

Major results

1987
1st  National Road Race Championship (Juniors)

1988
1st  National Road Race Championship (Juniors)
3rd Overall Emakumeen Euskal Bira
1st Prologue

1989
2nd National Road Race Championship

1991
1st  Overall Emakumeen Euskal Bira
1st Stages 2 & 3

1993
3rd National Road Race Championship

1994
1st  National Road Race Championship

1996
1st  National Time Trial Championship
3rd Overall Emakumeen Euskal Bira
3rd National Road Race Championship

1997
2nd National Time Trial Championship
3rd National Road Race Championship

1998
2nd Overall Emakumeen Euskal Bira
3rd Overall Giro del Trentino Alto Adige - Südtirol

1999
1st  Overall Giro d'Italia Femminile
1st Stage 10b

2000
1st  Overall Tour de France Feminine
1st Stages 4 & 6
1st  Overall Giro d'Italia Femminile

1st Stage 6b
2001
1st  Overall Emakumeen Euskal Bira

2002
1st Emakumen Saria
3rd World Championship Road Race

2003
1st  World Time Trial Championship
1st Emakumen Saria
3rd Overall Giro d'Italia Femminile
3rd National Road Race Championship

2004
1st  Overall Emakumeen Euskal Bira
1st Stages 2, 3a & 3b
1st Emakumen Saria
7th Olympic Games Road Race
7th Olympic Games Time Trial

2005
1st  Overall Trophée d'Or Féminin
1st Stage 3
2nd Overall Giro d'Italia Femminile
2nd World Championship Time Trial

References

1972 births
Living people
Spanish female cyclists
Cyclists from the Basque Country (autonomous community)
Cyclists at the 1996 Summer Olympics
Cyclists at the 2000 Summer Olympics
Cyclists at the 2004 Summer Olympics
Olympic cyclists of Spain
UCI Road World Champions (women)
People from Guernica
Sportspeople from Biscay
20th-century Spanish women